The 2007–08 Elitserien was the 74th season of the top division of Swedish handball. 14 teams competed in the league. The eight highest placed teams qualified for the playoffs, whereas teams 11–12 had to play relegation playoffs against teams from the second division, and teams 13–14 were relegated automatically. Hammarby IF won the regular season and also won the playoffs to claim their third Swedish title.

League table

Playoffs bracket 

An asterisk (*) denotes result after extra time

References 

Swedish handball competitions